Tyrone Williams may refer to:

 Tyrone Williams (cornerback) (born 1973), American NFL player for the Green Bay Packers
 Tyrone Williams (wide receiver) (born 1970), Canadian journeyman in the NFL and CFL
 Tyrone Williams (defensive tackle) (born 1972), Canadian former NFL and current British Columbia Lions player
 Tyrone Williams (jockey) (died 2021), British jockey, winner of the 1997 Ebor Handicap